Nelson Dilipkumar, credited in films as Nelson, is an Indian director and screenwriter who predominantly works in Tamil cinema. His films are action thrillers and are known for featuring elements of dark humor.

Nelson won the Best Screenplay Award in Norway Tamil Film Festival for his directorial debut Kolamaavu Kokila. He was listed among the Promising Directors of 2018 in Times of India article.

Film career 
Nelson holds a degree in visual communication from New College, Chennai. He started his career as an assistant script-writer in Star Vijay.

Nelson started his work on what was originally intended to have been his directorial debut, Vettai Mannan, in 2010. The film would have starred Silambarasan, Jai, Hansika Motwani and Deeksha Seth; would have been produced by NIC Arts's S. S. Chakravarthy; and would have featured music by Yuvan Shankar Raja. However, the film was shelved for unknown reasons halfway through production. There was an attempt to revive the project in 2017 with a new crew, such as Anirudh Ravichander replacing Yuvan Shankar Raja as the composer. However, the project failed to take off again.

Composer Anirudh Ravichander helped Nelson make his actual debut feature film as writer-director, the dark comedy Kolamaavu Kokila, starring Nayanthara in the lead role. The film, produced by Lyca Productions, released on 17 August 2018 and became a commercial success.

His next film was Doctor, starring Sivakarthikeyan in the lead role opposite Priyanka Arul Mohan. The film became one of the biggest Tamil-language blockbusters among films that released theatrically after the pandemic-induced lockdowns.

In November 2020, Anirudh introduced Nelson to actor Vijay, who was impressed with Nelson's script for Beast. The film, an action-comedy thriller and Vijay's 65th film, also starring Pooja Hegde, was released on 13 April 2022 as a pan-Indian film dubbed in the Telugu, Hindi, Kannada and Malayalam languages. Beast collected 240 crore at the worldwide box office.

Nelson's next project is for Rajinikanth’s 169th film which is tentatively titled Thalaivar 169. On 17 June 2022, the title was announced to be Jailer. Rajinikanth will be playing the role of an experienced jailer in this film. The film will be released in the month of summer in 2023.

Filmmaking style
Nelson's style of direction often features a serious protagonist with deadpan dialogues. Most of the comedy is then dependent on the supporting characters. Nelson's supporting characters are often singled out for their eccentricity, relying on body language and dialogue delivery to produce humor. Nelson also tends to use double act comedy extensively, such as Bobi and Tony in Kolamaavu Kokila; Mahaali and Kili in Doctor and Beast; and Jack and Jill in Beast. Visually, Nelson's filmography can be identified through steady camera shots, blocked shots and headspace, rarely opting for zoom shots. Nelson has cited C. V. Sridhar, Steven Spielberg, and Quentin Tarantino as his favorite directors. Many critics and audience members have also noted Breaking Bad references in his work. Nelson has often stated in interviews that although his stories may not be original ideas, he has the intention of presenting them in a new format, thus breaking clichés.

Filmography

Recurring collaborations 
Editor R. Nirmal and music composer Anirudh Ravichander have worked in four films of Nelson Dilipkumar. Actors Yogi Babu and Redin Kingsley have also worked on four films. Shaji Chen has worked on two movies. Bjorn Surrao, Sunil Reddy, Shiva Aravind, and Arun Alexander also acted in two films. D. R. K. Kiran has done the art direction in three films. Stunt directors Anbariv have worked on two films. Sivakarthikeyan has written lyrics for 3 out of 4 movies. Vijay Kartik Kannan was the D.O.P. for two of his movies.

Awards and nominations

References

External links 
 
 

Living people
Tamil film directors
Year of birth missing (living people)